The 2005–06 Idaho Vandals men's basketball team represented the University of Idaho during the 2005–06 NCAA Division I men's basketball season. New members of the Western Athletic Conference (WAC), the Vandals were led by fifth-year head coach Leonard Perry and played their home games on campus at Cowan Spectrum in Moscow, Idaho.

They drew top seed and host Nevada in the quarterfinal of the conference tournament in Reno and lost to the Wolf Pack by thirteen  Perry was fired shortly after the game, and assistant George Pfeifer was promoted to head coach in

Postseason result

|-
!colspan=5 style=| WAC Tournament

References

External links
Sports Reference – Idaho Vandals: 2005–06 basketball season
Idaho Argonaut – student newspaper – 2006 editions

Idaho Vandals men's basketball seasons
Idaho
Idaho Vandals men's basketball team
Idaho Vandals men's basketball team